Philkeram Johnson S.A. was the first and largest ceramic tiles producer in Greece and was established in 1961 by the Philippou family and Christos Constantopoulos. In the 2000s, it occupied 350 people and had an annual production of 4,500,000 m². Almost 30% of the production was exported to more than 29 countries.

Establishment
Philkeram Johnson was established in 1961 in Pylaia, in the province of Thessaloniki, in an area that was recovering from the catastrophic effects of the Greek civil war. During the post-war reconstruction period, the Greek market covered its small needs of ceramic tiles by importing from advanced industrial countries (Italy, Spain etc.) The Philippou family, devoted to the ceramic art for more than 120 years at the time studied the needs of the market and in 1961 established Philkeram (its name comes from the first letters of the name Philippou and Keramika (the Greek word for ceramics). Philkeram ceramics specialists led by its founder, George Philippou, who had returned from his studies in Belgium, proceeded to design and produce a high-level product: The Earthenware tile.

Growth
The successful operation of Philkeram during its first two years of its existence drew the attention of international investors. In 1963, the English Richard Tiles Ltd became a 50% partner in the company, renaming it to Philkeram – Richards S.A. This tripled the production and substantially increased the company's exports.
In 1966 Philkeram - Richards S.A. introduced, for the first time, the embossed tile, thereby increasing its exports to the EEC and the Middle East. The increased demand was dealt with investment in new equipment and the quadrupling of staff. In 1969 Richard Tiles Ltd merged with H & R Johnson Ltd, leading the company's title to be changed again to Philkeram - Johnson S.A. The invested capital reached 100,000,000 GRD, while the ownership structure is maintained at previous levels. The staff stood at 350 people and the sheltered company area covered 21,000 m2. In 1979, H & R Johnson was acquired by Nocros Plc, which today still owns 50% of Philkeram - Johnson S.A. In 1982 Industrial Mining S.A. is founded, which produces and markets building materials, with special expertise in tile adhesives and grouts.

At first Philkeram Johnson produced only white square tiles (15x15 cm). Soon, however, the range spread to other colours. Then the company proceeded to install decorative machines that allowed the company to present a wider range of designs and colours, thus beginning the first exports. Development continued with the production of wall tiles of various dimensions as well as experimenting with and studying the production of tiles and flooring.

After extensive research and testing, production began in new facilities in 1982. The main features of these facilities was not only flexibility in production but also a significant advantage in quality output. Foundations were placed for subsequent development in single-fired technology which were completed in August 1988. The production method of the single-fired tiles was based on Western European technology. Philkeram Johnson was one of the first units of its field who adopted and implemented this technology. This new method is automatic, producing high quality products, and is mainly used for flooring indoor and outdoor spaces, with the necessary technical specifications.

In 1987, the company invested heavily in new technology. The same year a new product became available to the market, Kerastar. These are floor tiles for special purposes, made with the most innovative technological global developments and exceeding even the highest standards. The company participated in the exhibition tiles in Los Angeles, 1987, and was awarded second prize among 400 exhibitors, thus entering dynamically in the U.S. market.
In 1994, Hippocampus S.A. was founded, focusing on the production of specific pieces for pools and accompanying ornamental tiles. The pool sector had to be separated, being an area which must strictly adhere to basic standards of safety and hygiene. Two years later, Philkeram Johnson was certified with the ISO: 9002, while Industrial Mining with ISO: 9001.

In 2003, "Jumpo I", a sophisticated production line is installed, an investment of €6,000,000 which radically changed the production structure of the company. Five years later, in 2008, the second sophisticated production line, "Jumpo II", was installed, which premiered in October 2008 at an event attended by the Minister of Development. In these difficult economic times, the company dares to invest and modernize, expressing its willingness to strengthen and maintain leadership, but also continues to valuably contribute to society.

Financial crisis
The rise and evolution of Philkeram Johnson, but was interrupted by the arrival of the global financial crisis, which struck at first, and perhaps more heavily than other sectors of the area in which we operate, that this construction. The lack of interest by consumers to purchase new property and the general decline in investor interest as regards the construction and building materials affected and our company.
The year 2008 showed the direct impact that the events were cyclical market in our company. The general manufacturing downturn that began and was maintained throughout the year, coupled with the extremely high price of energy resources and especially of liquid and gaseous fuels by object disproportionately borne the cost of our products. The movement of this cost was impossible to go on the market because of the reported downturn in the construction industry and the huge competition, which appeared in our products. Consequence of all these was the limitation of our turnover (sales, products, etc.) from 34,360 million euros in 2007, to 30,369 million, a decrease of 3,991 million euros, corresponding to rate of 11.61%.

The second major weight received was the cost of energy (electricity and gaseous fuels), which, from 4,187 million euros in 2007 reached 5,511 million euros, an increase of 1,324 million or 31.62%. Also, the financial costs of 2,129 million euros in 2007 totaled 2,506 million euros, an increase of 377 thousand euros, which equates to 17.70%. The losses for the years 2007 and 2008 amounted to 654 thousand euros and 5,170 million euros respectively.

During 2009 continued the downward trend of the company. The amount of sales decreased by €6,372,478.02 or 20.98%, reaching over €23,996,138.88 €30,368,616.90, while financial expenses amounted to 2.444 million euros. The unit cost of energy (electricity and gaseous fuels) decreased by 16.78%. The net result amounted to a loss of around €5,649,186.00 €5,170,331.00 against a loss last year. The construction market continues to decline, reaching an annual basis to (-) 49%.

2010 sales amounted to €14,099,464.44 compared, a decrease of 9,897 million, or 41.24% while financial expenses amounted to 2.114 million euro against 2.444 in 2009. The unit cost of energy has increased by 33.62% while losses amounted to €7,954,990, compared to 5.649 million in 2009.

The above described difficult economic conditions prevailing in our industry, a further increased) by the accumulation of the (requirements of our customers) our customers' debts to the company, and b) the unexpected change in policy of some banks, with which work and which instead support us through this crisis, exacerbating the liquidity problems facing our business, as well as citing the unfavorable position, which has reached the global financial system, drastically reduced funding in the face and the company us, and simultaneously increased their guarantees through post-dated checks.

People
17 September 1994 - Extract from speech G. K. Philippou:
"... someone once told me, « My mother taught me patience. My father, persistence.» I heard them both and prospered. I trusted man, I trusted him and did not regret ..."
Aspiring to the philosophy of the founder of the company, Philkeram Johnson has set itself as part of its vision the essential element of supporting people and their needs and taking care of them at all times, to the extent possible. Philkeram Johnson was the first company established to facilitate its workers with its own means of transport and special economic benefits (loans, facilities, etc.). It is standard policy to reach out and support its staff.

References

Ceramics manufacturers
Manufacturing companies established in 1961
Manufacturing companies based in Thessaloniki
1961 establishments in Greece